Damir is a common male given name in South Slavic languages. It also occasionally appears in Central Asia and Turkic regions of Russia.

It is of Slavic origin, with da meaning "give"/"take", and mir, meaning "peace".

It can also be a variation of a Turkish name "Demir", which means "iron".

In Tatar names, DAMIR is also an acronym for "Да здравствует мировая революция", meaning "Long live the world revolution".

In Croatia, the name Damir was among the most common masculine given names in the decades between 1960 and 1979.

Notable people with the name include:

 Damir Bajs, Croatian politician
 Damir Bičanić, Croatian handball player
 Damir Bjelopoljak, Bosnian volleyball player
 Damir Botonjič, Slovenian football player
 Damir Burić (disambiguation), several people
 Damir Čakar, Montenegrin football player
 Damir Čeković, Serbian football player
 Damir Čerkić, Bosnian football player
 Damir Desnica, Croatian football player
 Damir Dokić, father of Serbian Australian tennis player Jelena Dokić
 Damir Doma, German fashion designer of Croatian descent
 Damir Drinić, Serbian football player
 Damir Dugonjič, Slovenian swimmer
 Damir Duvelek, Swedish hitman of Bosnian descent
 Damir Džidić, Croatian football player of Bosnia and Herzegovina descent
 Damir Džombić, Bosnian football player
 Damir Džumhur, Bosnian tennis player
 Damir Ervin, American cartoonist, artist, animator
 Damir Fejzić, Serbian taekwondo practitioner
 Damir Glavan, Croatian water polo player
 Damir Hadžić (footballer, born 1978), Bosnian-Herzegovinian footballer
 Damir Hadžić (footballer, born 1984), Slovenian footballer
 Damir Ibrić, Bosnian football player
 Damir Jurković, Croatian football player
 Damir Kahriman, Serbian footballer of Romani descent
 Damir Kajin, Croatian politician
 Damir Kaletović, Bosnian journalist
 Damir Kedžo, Croatian singer
 Damir Keretić, German tennis player of Croatian descent
 Damir Kreilach, Croatian football player
 Damir Krupalija, Bosnian basketball player
 Damir Krznar, Croatian football player
 Damir Kukuruzović, Croatian jazz guitarist
 Damir Lesjak, Croatian football player
 Damir Maričić, Croatian football player
 Damir Markota, Bosnian basketball player
 Damir Martin, Croatian rower
 Damir Matovinović, Croatian football referee
 Damir Mehić, Swedish footballer of Bosnian descent
 Damir Memišević, Bosnian football player
 Damir Mikec, Serbian sport shooter of Croatian descent
 Damir Milinović, Croatian football player and manager
 Damir Mirvić, Bosnian football player
 Damir Mršić, Bosnian basketball player
 Damir Mulaomerović, Croatian basketball player of Bosnian descent
 Damir Nikšić, Bosnian conceptual artist
 Damir Pekič, Slovenian football player
 Damir Pertič, Slovenian futsal player
 Damir Petravić, Croatian football player and manager
 Damir Polančec, Croatian politician
 Damir Puškar, Slovenian futsal player
 Damir Rančić, Croatian basketball player
 Damir Rastić, Serbian biathlete
 Damir Rašić, Croatian football player
 Damir Rilje, Croatian politician
 Damir Sadikov, Russian football player
 Damir Salimov, Uzbek film director
 Damir Shadaev, Russian politician
 Damir Siraciev, Tatar theatre director and actor
 Damir Skomina, Slovenian football referee
 Damir Stojak, Serbian football player
 Damir Škaro, Croatian boxer
 Damir Šolman, Croatian basketball player
 Damir Šovšić, Croatian football player of Bosnian descent
 Damir Špica, Bosnian football player
 Damir Šutevski, Yugoslavian-Canadian association football player
 Damir Urban, Croatian musician
 Damir Vitas, Croatian footballer
 Damir Vrabac, Bosnian football player
 Damir Vrančić, Bosnian footballer of Croatian descent
 Damir Yusupov, Russian pilot known for safely crash landing Ural Airlines Flight 178
 Damir Zaynullin, Russian murder victim of Tatar descent
 Damir Zlomislić, Bosnian football player

See also

References

Masculine given names
Serbian masculine given names
Croatian masculine given names
Slavic masculine given names
Bosnian masculine given names